The 1978 United States Senate election in Iowa took place on November 7, 1978. Incumbent Democratic Senator Dick Clark ran for re-election to a second term but was defeated by Republican former Lieutenant Governor Roger Jepsen. This was the last time until 2014 that a Republican would win Iowa's class 2 Senate seat.

Democratic primary

Candidates
 Gerald Leo Baker, computer programmer and mathematician from Cedar Falls
Dick Clark, incumbent Senator
 Robert L. Nereim, resident of Des Moines and candidate for Senate in 1966

Results

Following his defeat, Gerald Leo Baker announced an independent campaign for the general election.

Republican primary

Candidates
Joe Bertroche
Roger Jepsen, former Lieutenant Governor of Iowa
Maurie Van Nostrand

Results

General election

Results

See also 
 1978 United States Senate elections

References 

1978
Iowa
United States Senate